Elton Williams (born 4 July 1973) is a Guyanese-born Montserratian international football player who plays in defence for Ideal SC in the Montserrat Championship.

References

1973 births
Living people
Montserrat international footballers
Montserratian footballers
Association football defenders